The Northern Eastern Sudanic, Eastern k Sudanic, Ek Sudanic, NNT or Astaboran languages may form a primary division of the yet-to-be-demonstrated Eastern Sudanic family. They are characterised by having a /k/ in the first person singular pronoun "I/me", as opposed to the Southern Eastern Sudanic languages, which have an /n/. Nyima has yet to be conclusively linked to the other languages, and would appear to be the closest relative of Ek Sudanic rather than Ek Sudanic proper.

The most well-known language of this group is Nubian. According to Claude Rilly, the ancient Meroitic language appears on limited evidence to be closest to languages of this group.

A reconstruction of Proto-Northern Eastern Sudanic has also been proposed by Rilly (2010: 347-349).

Internal classification
Rilly (2009:2) provides the following internal structure for the Northern Eastern Sudanic languages.
Northern East Sudanic
Nyima: Nyimang, Afitti
Taman: Tama, Mararit
Nara-Nubian
Nara
Meroitic-Nubian
Meroitic
Nubian
Western Nubian
Birgid
Midob, Kordofan Nubian
Nile Nubian
Old Dongolawi, Kenuzi, Dongolawi
Old Nubian, Nobiin

External relationships
Based on morphological evidence such as tripartite number marking on nominals, Roger Blench (2021) suggests that the Maban languages may be closely related.

See also

List of Northern Eastern Sudanic reconstructions (Wiktionary)

References

 M. L. Bender, 2000. "Nilo-Saharan". In African Languages: An Introduction, edited by Bernd Heine and Derek Nurse. Cambridge University Press.
George Starostin (2015) The Eastern Sudanic hypothesis tested through lexicostatistics: current state of affairs (Draft 1.0)

 
Eastern Sudanic languages
Proposed language families